Faculty of Law, Göttingen University is the Faculty of Law of University of Göttingen in Göttingen, Niedersachsen, Germany. Established in 1737, the law faculty belongs to one of the four founding faculties of the university. It offers the Dipl.-Jur., LL.M. and Dr. jur. degrees in law. It also hosts visiting scholars and several legal research centers.

The leading German legal scholar Rudolf von Jhering taught here in the late 19th century. Otto von Bismarck, "Iron Chancellor" of the second German Empire once studied law here in Göttingen. The former German President Richard von Weizsäcker obtained his Dr.iur. at Göttingen in 1955. Chancellor Gerhard Schröder studied there later in the century and became a lawyer thereafter.

History 
Throughout the 18th century the University of Göttingen was at the top of German universities for its extremely free spirit and atmosphere of scientific exploration and research. Napoleon had even studied law here and remarked that "Göttingen belongs to the whole Europe".

In the first years of the University of Göttingen it became famous for its faculty of law. In the 18th century Johann Stephan Pütter, the most prestigious scholar of public law at that time, taught jus publicum here for half a century, which had attracted a great number of students such as Klemens von Metternich, later diplomat and prime minister of Austria, and Wilhelm von Humboldt, who later set up the University of Berlin.

By 1837, when the university was a hundred years old, the University of Göttingen had earned its fame as "university of law" because almost every year the students enrolled by the faculty of law made up more than half of all the students on the campus. Göttingen became a mecca for the study of public law in Germany. Heinrich Heine, the famous German poet, studied law and was awarded Dr.iur.

However, political disturbances, in which both professors and students were implicated, lowered the attendance to 860 in 1834. The expulsion in 1837 of the famous seven professors – Die Göttingen Seven for protesting against the revocation by King Ernest Augustus of Hanover of the liberal constitution of 1833, further reduced the prosperity of the university.

Thereafter, Gustav Hugo, forerunner of the historical school of law, and Rudolf von Jhering, a most significant jurist who created the theory of "culpa in contraendo" and wrote Battle for Right, taught here in the 19th century and maintained the good reputation of the faculty of law. Otto von Bismarck, the main creator and first chancellor of the second German Empire, had also studied law in Göttingen in 1833 and lived in a tiny house on the "Wall" (according to oral tradition, he lived there because his rowdiness had caused him to be banned from living within the city walls), now known as "Bismarck Cottage".

Notable alumni

Student Journal 

There is one student journal in the field of international law which is published online in English – Goettingen Journal of International Law.

References

External links
 Faculty Website
 Goettingen Journal of International Law 

University of Göttingen
1737 establishments in Europe
Educational institutions established in 1737